Heriraz (also Romanized as Herīraz and Harī Raz) is a village in Samen Rural District, Samen District, Malayer County, Hamadan Province, Iran. At the 2006 census, its population was 60, in 20 families.

References 

Populated places in Malayer County